The Australian Superkart Championship is a motor racing series run in Australia under the auspices of CAMS under their Superkart regulations. The karts race on full-size Australian circuits and in 2013 the series was raced at Sydney Motorsport Park and Phillip Island Grand Prix Circuit. As of 2007 the series has raced as part of the Shannons Nationals Motor Racing Championships. The series is one of nine that enjoy full CAMS Australian Championship status.

National titles have also been run by other sanctioning organisations over the years as one-off events.

Classes
Presently three different classes of Superkart compete in the Australian championship: 250 International (for two cylinder 250cc engines), 250 National (for single cylinder 250cc engines), 125 Gearbox (for 125cc engines). Rotax max family of classes no longer compete for Australian championship status but have a single event non-gearbox Nationals with three classes: Rotax Light and Rotax Heavy, both weight based categories and Rotax Junior for drivers of the ages 12–16, and they run their Rotax 125cc engines without a power valve, reducing the power output of the class relative to Rotax Light and Rotax Heavy. While all classes compete for a national title, because of regulations in 2008 only the winners of the 250 International class has consistently been able to claim Australian Champion. Prior to the widespread popularity of Rotax Max the non-gearbox classes were 100cc engine capacity. Previously there was also a fourth gearbox class for 80cc engines Superkarts but numbers have dwindled in recent times to the point that 80cc class has been folded into 125cc class at national level and today only survives in limited numbers at state level.

Champions
The following is a compilation of Australian Superkart championship and national series winners. Since 1980 superkart motor racing series have been run under AKA & CAMS regulation. Prior to 1989 titles existed run under AKA authority. Run originally as single event championship it blossomed into a multi-event series in the early 2000s.

One of the most successful driver in Superkart racing is Warren McIlveen who has won 7  titles, six of them in the top class, 250 International. The most successful & cross-class driver has been Brian Stockman who has won eight titles across four classes. 2 x 80cc, 1 x 125cc, 2 x 250cc single & 3 x 250cc international. Jason McIntyre, Luke May and Jeff Reed are the only drivers to have won both Gearbox and non-Gearbox titles. Both the non-gearbox classes 100cc and Rotax Max have both used Light, Heavy and Junior classes to further sub-divide their numbers on occasion. They are indicate L: Light, H: Heavy and J: Junior.

Due partially to falling numbers not all have been recognised as Australian Champions, some only as national series winners. For example, in 2009 only the 250 International class was recognised with the status of Australian champion. Numbers have since rebounded.

Attempts to run a Rotax Max title since 2009 had collapsed on multiple occasions but a replacement event no longer considered an Australian Championship was run in 2011.

* Indicates winner of a national series rather than Australian championship.

References

External links
 Official championship website

 
Superkart Championship
Kart racing events
Superkart